An air division is an air force or naval air formation that is roughly equivalent to an army division. An air division is usually commanded by a major general and it is composed of multiple wings, groups, air brigades, or equivalently-sized air force formations.

Examples
Examples of air divisions which have been used in different nations include:

 Aviation Division of Soviet forces
 Air Division (United States)
 1 Canadian Air Division and 2 Canadian Air Division
 Air divisions in the German Luftwaffe (see Organization of the Luftwaffe (1933–45)#Fliegerkorps and Fliegerdivision)
 Air divisions in the German Bundeswehr (see :de:Luftwaffendivision)
 1st Fighter Aviation Division (People's Liberation Army Air Force) of China, and other aviation divisions
 Royal Thai Naval Air Division

See also
 
 
 Aeronautical Division, U.S. Signal Corps (1907–1914)
 Aviation Division (Pakistan) (a department of Government of Pakistan, not an air division)
 :Category:Air divisions (air force unit)

References

Air divisions (air force unit)